The West Indies cricket team toured India, playing two Test matches and a three-match One Day International series against the Indian national team from 31 October to 27 November 2013. The series, not initially in the ICC Future Tours Programme, was hastily arranged by the Board of Control for Cricket in India (BCCI) following the postponement of India's scheduled tour to South Africa to December, with that series itself reduced to 2 Tests and 3 ODIs due to a spat between the BCCI and Cricket South Africa.

The series was notable for Indian cricketer Sachin Tendulkar's retirement from all forms of the game at the conclusion of the second Test, which was his 200th overall.

Squads

Tour match

Test series

First Test
{{Test match
| date = 6–10 November
| team1 = 
| team2 = 
| score-team1-inns1 = 234 (78 overs)
| runs-team1-inns1 = Marlon Samuels 65 (98 Balls)
| wickets-team1-inns1 = Mohammed Shami 4/71 (17 Overs)
| score-team2-inns1 = 453 (129.4 overs)
| runs-team2-inns1 = Rohit Sharma 177 (301 Balls)
| wickets-team2-inns1 = Shane Shillingford 6/167 (55 Overs)
| score-team1-inns2 = 168 (54.1 overs)
| runs-team1-inns2 = Darren Bravo 37 (78 Balls)
| wickets-team1-inns2 = Mohammed Shami 5/47 (13.1 Overs)
| score-team2-inns2 = 
| runs-team2-inns2 = 
| wickets-team2-inns2 = 
| result =  India won by an innings and 51 runs
| venue = Eden Gardens, Kolkata
| umpires = Nigel Llong (Eng) and Richard Kettleborough (Eng)
| motm = Rohit Sharma (Ind)
| report = Scorecard
| toss = West Indies won the toss and elected to bat
| rain = 
| notes = Mohammed Shami and Rohit Sharma made their Test debuts for India.
 Sheldon Cottrell made his Test debut for West Indies.
}}

Debuting in the international Test series, Mohammed Shami took 4 wickets giving 71 runs off 17 overs he bowled in the first innings. In second innings he took 5 wickets giving 47 runs of 13.1 overs. This performance was compared with the best score by a medium-paced Indian bowler Syed Abid Ali who took 6 wickets giving 55 runs off 17 overs against Australia in 1967. Rohit Sharma also debuted in Test match with this match and scored the highest runs of 177 and marked his first century in the format.

Being the 199th Test match of Tendulkar and his last at Eden Gardens, the Cricket Association of Bengal (CAB) celebrated the event in a grand scale. A music album launched dedicated to his achievements was played at various intersections in the city of Kolkata when he arrived. The stadium displayed a life-size wax statue of Tendulkar and a cake of 199 Shôndeshs and 199 tricolour balloons were released. On 8 November, around 2000 students in Alathur, Palakkad district, Kerala donned Tendulkar masks to pay tribute to him.

Second Test

Tendulkar's retirement
In October 2013, Indian cricketer Sachin Tendulkar declared he would retire from Tests and all other forms of cricket after playing the second Test against the West Indies. He had retired from ODIs in December 2012, and from the Twenty20 format in October 2013, after he played the 2013 Champions League Twenty20, where his team Mumbai Indians took the winner's trophy. The match would be Tendulkar's 200th Test match. On his request, the Board of Control for Cricket in India (BCCI) agreed to schedule the match at Wankhede Stadium, his home ground in Mumbai.

Mumbai Cricket Association (MCA), the governing body for cricket in Mumbai and its surrounding regions, planned various events in honour of Tendulkar's retirement. Sharad Pawar, the president of the MCA, called it the "end of a golden era". On 11 November, MCA named the Association's ground at Mahavir Nagar, Kandivali in North Mumbai as "Sachin Tendulkar Gymkhana Club". The stadium had cutouts displaying various events from Tendulkar's career, and each ticket had his photograph and listed his 51 Test centuries. The online ticket booking for the match started from 11 November on Kyazoonga.com, and crashed multiple times due to high traffic. The online travel agency Musafir.com arranged 200 taxis to connect from various locations in Mumbai to the stadium for free for the match. On 12 November, India Today organized a day-long Salaam Sachin Conclave'' where various cricketers, celebrities of Bollywood, politicians and others spoke about him.

Day 1
The match started with a toss of special gold coin flipped by the Indian captain M. S. Dhoni, winning the toss and choosing to bowl. The special golden coin had Tendulkar's image inscribed on one side and MCA's logo on other. The token coin was then presented to Tendulkar as a memento. 1000 more replicas were presented to dignitaries. The Union Minister of India, Kapil Sibal then unveiled Tendulkar's postal stamp. Tendulkar became the second Indian after Mother Teresa to have such stamp released in their lifetime.

West Indies were bowled out for 182 from 55.2 overs. Kieran Powell scored the highest with 48 runs. Indian left-arm orthodox spinner Pragyan Ojha took the maximum of 5 wickets. At the end of the inning, captain and wicketkeeper Dhoni completed 251 dismissals by a wicketkeeper and became 7th to do so in the history. Indian right-arm off-break bowler Ravichandran Ashwin took his 100th Test wicket with captain Darren Sammy and became the 5th fastest in the history to do so in 18 Test matches. India's batting started with Murali Vijay scoring the highest of 43 runs for the day. At the loss of two wickets and Tendulkar (38) and Cheteshwar Pujara (34) batting, the day ended with 157 total runs by Indian team.

Day 2
Continuing ahead, Tendulkar and Pujara reached 74 and 113 respectively. Tendulkar recorded his 68th Test 50, but was dismissed for 74, missing his 101st International century. Rohit Sharma finished on 111 not out, his second consecutive century. By the end of day two, India led by 313 runs with a total score of 495. Shane Shillingford recorded fifth consecutive five-for in five innings, nearing the record of six consecutive five-fors set by Charlie Turner in 1888. The day ended with West Indies on 43 with loss of 3 wickets.

Day 3
West Indies started on their chase from previous day's score of 43 but wound up all out at 187. India won the game by an innings and 126 runs and thus the over all Test series as 2-0. Ojha again took the highest of 5 wickets in this inning. Tendulkar in his emotional speech thanked various personalities of his life along with the audience. In return, the crowd screamed "Thank you". The hashtags like #ThankYouSachin, #SachinSachin and #SRT200 trended on social media sites like Twitter and Facebook.

ODI series

1st ODI

2nd ODI

3rd ODI

References

External links
West Indies tour of India 2013-14 at Wisden India
West Indies in India 2013-14 at ESPNcricinfo

2013 in Indian cricket
2013 in West Indian cricket
Indian cricket seasons from 2000–01
International cricket competitions in 2013–14
2013